Hsenwi, also known as Theinni, was a Shan state in the Northern Shan States in what is today Burma. The capital was Hsenwi town.

History
Most Tai Yai chronicles begin with the story of two brothers, Khun Lung and Khun Lai, who descended from heaven in the 6th century and landed in Hsenwi, where the local population hailed them as kings.

According to tradition, the predecessor state of Siviraṭṭha was founded before 650 AD.

Hsenwi was the largest of the cis-Salween Shan states, and at one time included all of what are now the present states of North and South Hsenwi, Kehsi Mansam, Mong Hsu, Mong Sang, and Mong Nawng. It held Mongnai State until c. 1802. It also held Mang Lon and other Wa states east of the Salween in a protectorate-like arrangement, but during Burmese times, the state lost control of these areas.

During the Sino-Burmese War (1765–69) the Qianlong Emperor of China invaded the area of Hsenwi. The main Chinese army, led by Ming Rui, was to approach Ava through Hsenwi, Lashio and Hsipaw down the Namtu river. The main invasion route was the same route followed by the Manchu forces a century earlier, chasing the Yongli Emperor of the Southern Ming dynasty. The second army, led by Gen. E'erdeng'e, was to try the Bhamo route again. The ultimate objective was for both armies to clamp themselves in a pincer action on the Burmese capital of Ava. The Burmese plan was to hold the second Chinese army in the north at Kaungton with the army led by Ne Myo Sithu, and meet the main Chinese army in the northeast with two armies led by Maha Sithu and Maha Thiha Thura.

At first, everything went according to plan for the Qing. The third invasion began in November 1767 as the smaller Chinese army attacked and occupied Bhamo. Within eight days, Ming Rui's main army occupied the Shan states of Hsenwi and Hsipaw. Ming Rui made Hsenwi a supply base, and assigned 5000 troops to remain at Hsenwi and guard the rear. He then led a 15,000-strong army in the direction of Ava. In late December, at the Goteik Gorge (south of Hsipaw), the two main armies faced off and the first major battle of the third invasion ensued. Outnumbered two-to-one, Maha Sithu's main Burmese army was thoroughly routed by Ming Rui's Bannermen. Maha Thiha Thura too was repulsed at Hsenwi. The news of the disaster at Goteik reached Ava. Hsinbyushin finally realized the gravity of the situation, and urgently recalled Burmese armies from Siam.

Having smashed through the main Burmese army, Ming Rui pressed on full steam ahead, overrunning one town after another, and reached Singu on the Irrawaddy, 30 miles north of Ava at the beginning of 1768. The only bright spot for the Burmese was that the northern invasion force, which was to come down the Irrawaddy to join up with Ming Rui's main army, had been held off at Kaungton.

British rule and division of the state
At the time of the annexation following British rule in Burma, Hsenwi was composed of five de jure divisions; but the administration of the area was in chaos, with no central control. 

After the pacification of the region in March 1888, the colonial administration divided Hsenwi into two states:

North Hsenwi, assigned to a successful adventurer, Hkun Sang, of Ton Hong.
South Hsenwi which went to Nawmong, of the old Shan ruling house.

Rulers
The rulers of Hsenwi bore the title Saopha.

Saophas

Popular culture

 Hsenwi is a playable nation in the strategy video game Europa Universalis IV.

See also
Hsenwi Yazawin
Sino-Burmese War (1765–69)

References

External links
The Imperial Gazetteer of India
"Gazetteer of Upper Burma and the Shan states"

Hsenwi (Shan Princely State)

19th century in Burma
Shan States